Quietude is a studio album by Brazilian jazz pianist Eliane Elias. Candid released the album on October 14, 2022.

Background
The album contains 11 songs mostly recorded in São Paulo during 2019–2020. To record the compositions she invited prominent guitarists. Oscar Castro-Neves joined Elias in the studio to record track "Tim Tim Por Tim Tim" before his passing in 2013. All the tracks are sung in Brazilian Portuguese. Elias explained, "I like to make music that I personally would like to hear. This album makes me feel good, at peace and relaxed and I hope that listeners feel the same." She also mentioned that "two current albums of the pandemic moment represent two different facets of her talent. Mirror Mirror was exclusively piano, while Quietude stresses her singing."

Reception
Marc Myers of The Wall Street Journal wrote "The album’s spare instrumentation places the emphasis on Ms. Elias’s seductive singing voice and the accompanying guitars. Her deep, warm tone imbues songs with a hushed yearning and traces of nostalgia. Most remarkable is that Ms. Elias sings without vocal affectation. Notes aren’t drawn out or fortified with vibrato. Instead, they simply are sung and swung like notes played on a piano without the sustaining pedal, perfectly articulating bossa nova’s syncopated appeal." Michael Major of BroadwayWorld stated, "With her intoxicating vocals on this vibrant bossa nova journey, Eliane has masterfully told these calming musical stories to her listeners. Her artistry demonstrates that alongside her many accolades as a brilliant pianist, Eliane can also wear the crown as the reigning queen of the bossa nova." Matt Collar of AllMusic commented that the "album put Elias' immense jazz, Latin, and classical keyboard skills on display. While she does play some piano here, Quietude intentionally spotlights her voice, pairing the Brazilian-born performer with several of her closest guitar friends on a handful of her favorite songs from her homeland."

JazzTimes included the album in The Top 40 Jazz Albums of 2022, giving it place #33.

Track listing

Personnel
Band
Eliane Elias – piano, vocals
Marcus Teixeira – guitar
Lula Galvão – guitar
Oscar Castro-Neves – guitar
Celso de Almeida – percussions
Marc Johnson – bass
Steve Rodby – bass
Emílio Martins – percussion
Dori Caymmi – voices

Production
Paul Blakemore – mastering
Pete Karam – mixing
Gabriel Teixeira – assistant engineer

References

External links

2022 albums
Candid Records albums
Eliane Elias albums